Awake iron! (Medieval Aragonese: Desperta Ferres!) was a battle cry of the Middle Ages employed by the Almogavars. It was shouted on entering the fight, to frighten the enemy and invoke the presence of iron in the battle.

Other Almogaver war-cries were Aragó, Aragó!, Via Sus! Via Sus!, Sant Jordi! Sant Jordi!.  However, of these Desperta Ferro! has emerged as the most famous, as it was unique to those forces.  The cry was given as the Almogàvers struck their lances and darts with flints, causing sparks to fly up from the stones.

Nowadays, it is still used as a motto for the Spanish Army 6th Paratroopers Brigade "Almogávares".

See also 
 Sicilian Vespers
 Catalan Company

References 

Almogavars
Military history of Catalonia
Reconquista
Battle cries
Military mottos